Rocky View School Division No. 41 or Rocky View Schools (RVS) is the public school authority that serves students to the west, north and east of the City of Calgary in the province of Alberta.

The original board's name was called Calgary Rural Schools Division #41, then eventually changed to Rocky View Schools.

Size
RVS serves approximately 25,000 students with educational services from Kindergarten to Grade 12. The district operates 51 schools in its jurisdiction.

Schools

Manachaban Middle School 

Manachaban Middle School is a school located in the small town of Cochrane, Alberta under Rocky View School Division No. 41.

Manachaban School was built in 1972, and was named after Manachaban Hill (Also known as "The Big Hill"). The name Manachaban Hill meaning where the first nations people went for bows and arrows. In this way, the name of the school reflects both the early history of the Cochrane Area, and also the earlier history of the area's original inhabitants.

Manachaban School offers education from grades 5–8, including a French immersion program available for all grades. It shares a field with the Cochrane High School, meaning the school has full access to the football field, a dual track, and a basketball court. It is a part of Rocky View School Division No. 41

The school houses over 551 students and 39 staff including Building Maintenance workers.

The school is a part of the Alberta Schools Athletic Association. It holds membership in the Rocky View Sports Association, where student's have the opportunity to participate in numerous sports starting at grade 6. Manachaban's team name is The Warriors and their jersey/team colours are red, white, and black.

Some of the sports the school offers include:
 Badminton
 Basketball - Jr. A Girls
 Basketball - Jr. A Boys
 Basketball - Jr. B
 Volleyball - Jr. A Girls
 Volleyball - Jr. A Boys
 Volleyball - Jr. B
 Track & Field
 Gr. 6 Sports

Governance
RVS is the fifth-largest school board in Alberta, and operates independently of its neighbouring Calgary school boards; Calgary Board of Education and the Calgary Catholic School District, but still operates under the direct authority of the provincial government of Alberta. The board consists of eight members who are elected every four years during municipal elections to represent seven urban and rural wards.

Special programs
RVS offers a variety of special programming to its students, such as French Immersion, Christian Education, Home Education, Outreach Campuses, and a Summer School program. The district board also recognizes students and their families with First Nations, Metis, and Inuit heritage by providing support services and programs through Native Liaison Workers.

See also
List of Alberta school boards
List of high schools in Alberta

References

External links
Manachaban Website
RVS Website
ASAA Website

Airdrie, Alberta